The 2014 CEV U20 Volleyball European Championship was the 24th edition of the Men's Junior European Volleyball Championship, organised by Europe's governing volleyball body, the CEV. It was held in  Nitra and Brno from 29 August to 6 September 2014.

Russia won their 18th title in the tournament by defeating Poland. Pavel Pankov was elected the Most Valuable Player.

Participating teams
 Host
 
 
 Qualified through 2014 Men's U20 Volleyball European Championship Qualification

Venues

Preliminary round
All times are Central European Summer Time (UTC+02:00)

Pool I 

|}

|}

Pool II 

|}

|}

Final round
All times are Central European Summer Time (UTC+02:00)

5th–8th place

5th–8th semifinals

|}

7th place match

|}

5th place match

|}

Final

Semifinals

|}

3rd place match

|}

Final

|}

Final standing

Individual awards

Most Valuable Player

Best Scorer

Best Spiker

Best Blocker

Best Server

Best Setter

Best Receiver

Best Libero

References

External links
 Confédération Européenne de Volleyball 

Men's Junior European Volleyball Championship
European Championship U20
International volleyball competitions hosted by Slovakia
International volleyball competitions hosted by the Czech Republic
2014 in Slovak sport
2014 in Czech sport
2014 in youth sport
August 2014 sports events in Europe
September 2014 sports events in Europe